The list of National Historic Landmarks in Nevada contains the landmarks designated by the U.S. Federal Government for the U.S. state of Nevada.
There are 8 National Historic Landmarks (NHLs) in Nevada.
The U.S. National Historic Landmark program is operated under the auspices of the National Park Service, and recognizes structures, districts, objects, and similar resources nationwide according to a list of criteria of national significance.
Nevada is home to 8 of these landmarks, highlighting Nevada's frontier heritage and other themes.  The National Historic Landmarks Survey: List of National Historic Landmarks by State lists seven landmarks, but includes the Leonard Rockshelter twice, and does not mention the Francis G. Newlands Home. However, the NHL Summary listing lists them correctly.

The table below lists all 8 of these sites, along with added detail and description.

|}

See also
 National Register of Historic Places listings in Nevada
 List of National Historic Landmarks by state

References

External links

National Historic Landmark Program at the National Park Service
Lists of National Historic Landmarks

 
NHL
Nevada
National Historic Landmarks